The 1995–96 Scottish Football League Third Division was the 2nd season in the format of ten teams in the fourth-tier of Scottish football. The season started on 11 August 1995 and ended on 3 May 1996. Livingston F.C. finished top and were promoted alongside runners-up Brechin City. Both teams were promoted straight back to the Second Division having both been relegated the previous season. Albion Rovers finished bottom for a second consecutive season.

Teams for 1995–96

Forfar Athletic as champions of the previous season were directly promoted to the 1995–96 Scottish Second Division alongside runners-up Montrose. They were replaced by Meadowbank Thistle and Brechin City who finished second bottom and bottom of the 1994–95 Scottish Second Division respectively. During the change of season Meadowbank Thistle relocated to and changed their name to Livingston for the 1995–96 season.

Overview
Relegated from Second Division to the Third Division
 Meadowbank Thistle (became Livingston)
 Brechin City

Stadia and locations

Table

References

External links 
Official site
1995/1996 Scottish Third Division at Soccerway
Scottish Football Archive

Scottish Third Division seasons
Scot
4